William Lawrence Evans (March 25, 1919 – November 30, 1983) was a relief pitcher in Major League Baseball who played for the Chicago White Sox (1949) and Boston Red Sox (1951). He was born in Quanah, Texas.

In a two-season Major League career, Evans posted a 0–1 record with a 4.36 ERA in 13 appearances, including five games finished, four strikeouts, 16 walks, and 21⅔ innings pitched. In 12 seasons in minor league baseball, he worked in 386 games and compiled a 128–127 (.502) mark, retiring after the 1955 season.

Evans served in the US Army in World War II as an infantry man, eventually earning the Bronze Star Medal and Silver Stars.

Evans died in Grand Junction, Colorado, at age 64.

References

1919 births
1983 deaths
Amarillo Gold Sox players
United States Army personnel of World War II
American people of Welsh descent
Baseball players from Texas
Boston Red Sox players
Burlington Bees players
Charleston Senators players
Charlotte Hornets (baseball) players
Cheyenne Indians players
Chicago White Sox players
Colorado Springs Sky Sox (WL) players
Little Rock Travelers players
Louisville Colonels (minor league) players
Major League Baseball pitchers
Memphis Chickasaws players
Muskegon Clippers players
Oakland Oaks (baseball) players
People from Quanah, Texas
Sacramento Solons players
San Francisco Seals (baseball) players
Seattle Rainiers players
Wichita Falls Spudders players